The 1950 Arizona State Sun Devils football team was an American football team that represented Arizona State College (later renamed Arizona State University) in the Border Conference during the 1950 college football season. In their fourth season under head coach Ed Doherty, the Sun Devils compiled a 9–1 record (4–1 against Border opponents), lost to Miami (OH) in the Salad Bowl, and outscored their opponents by a combined total of 404 to 154.

Schedule

References

Arizona State
Arizona State Sun Devils football seasons
Arizona State Sun Devils football